Seyd Beyg (also Romanized as Şeyd Beyg; also known as Seyyedī Beyg) is a village in Soluk Rural District of the Central District of Hashtrud County, East Azerbaijan province, Iran. At the 2006 National Census, its population was 643 in 134 households. The following census in 2011 counted 627 people in 152 households. The latest census in 2016 showed a population of 546 people in 131 households; it was the largest village in its rural district.

References 

Hashtrud County

Populated places in East Azerbaijan Province

Populated places in Hashtrud County